Frederick Merk (August 15, 1887 – September 24, 1977) was an American historian.  He taught at Harvard University from 1924 to 1956.

Biography 
Frederick Merk was born in Milwaukee, Wisconsin in 1887. He graduated from the University of Wisconsin in 1911 and then worked for five years at the Wisconsin Historical Society. In 1916 he went to Harvard University to study under  Frederick Jackson Turner.  Upon Turner's retirement in 1924, Merk took up his position with Turner's support. He taught at Harvard until 1956, and oversaw several dozen graduate students.

Scholarly impact 
John Morton Blum, one of Merk's graduate students after World War II, recalled of his mentor that Merk emphasized integrity, "an integrity of mind and process, of the way in which to understand and to write history, an integrity by his standards so severe that perhaps no one of his students could ever achieve it, but a quality he made so important that all of them would try."

Bibliography

References

External links

1887 births
1977 deaths
Writers from Milwaukee
20th-century American historians
American male non-fiction writers
Harvard University faculty
Harvard University alumni
University of Wisconsin–Madison alumni
Historians of American foreign relations
Historians of the United States
Writers from Massachusetts
Historians from Wisconsin
20th-century American male writers